Staveley Works F.C. was an English football club based in Staveley, Derbyshire.

History
The team participated in the Midland League, Northern Counties East League, Central Midlands Football League and the FA Vase.

References

Defunct football clubs in England
East Midlands Regional League
Midland Football League (1889)
Northern Counties East Football League
Central Midlands Football League
Association football clubs disestablished in 1989
1989 disestablishments in England
Defunct football clubs in Derbyshire
Works association football teams in England